Dianne Jackson (28 July 1941 – 31 December 1992) was an English animation director, best known for The Snowman, made in 1982 and subsequently repeated every Christmas on Channel 4 in the United Kingdom.

She had a long career as an animator, and her earliest credit was for The Beatles' Yellow Submarine in 1968. She is particularly noted for recreating the style of the original artists in her animations, for example of Raymond Briggs's picture book, The Snowman.
 
She also directed Granpa by John Burningham in 1989 and was due to direct Raymond Briggs' Father Christmas in 1991, having completed storyboarding for the film, although due to her illness this was directed by Dave Unwin. She also planned the first series of animated adaptations of the tales of Beatrix Potter as The World of Peter Rabbit and Friends. However, she died of cancer on New Year's Eve 1992 at the age of 51. The series episode "The Tailor of Gloucester", which was made the year after she died, is "dedicated to [her] memory".

References

External links

Dianne Jackson at the British Film Institute

1941 births
1992 deaths
British animated film directors
English animators